Qeshlaq-e Supurgali (also Romanized as Qeshlāq-e Sūpūrgalī; also known as Qeshlāq-e Arān, Qeshlāq-e Sopūrgalū, and Qeshlāq-e Sūpergalū) is a village in Tirchai Rural District, Kandovan District, Meyaneh County, East Azerbaijan Province, Iran. At the 2006 census, its population was 97, in 23 families.

References 

Populated places in Meyaneh County